Bitsui is a surname of Navajo origin. People known by the name include:
 Jeremiah Bitsui (born 1979/1980), American actor
 Sherwin Bitsui (born 1975), American poet

Native American surnames